Tomasz Byrt (born 25 January 1993) is a Polish ski jumper.

References

1993 births
Living people
Polish male ski jumpers
People from Cieszyn
Sportspeople from Silesian Voivodeship